The M-class submarines, also Malyutka class (baby or little one), were a class of small, single-, or 1½-hulled submarines built in the Soviet Union and used during World War II. The submarines were built in sections so they could easily be transported by rail. The production was centered in the Gorky Shipyard on the Volga River, after which the sections were transported by railway to Leningrad for assembly and fitting out. This was the first use of welding on Soviet submarines.

History

1930s to 1940s

Submarines of this class were in four series: VI, VI-bis, XII, XV. The number of VI and VI-bis series boats were almost equal. Series XII was a re-developed project with equivalent tactical characteristics. The first series were powered by one diesel engine and one electric motor. Series XV had developed separately with improved characteristics, including the main ballast in light hull and two shafts. These vessels were mainly used by the Black Sea Fleet and the Baltic Fleet.

Although the design was satisfactory, only limited results were obtained and losses were heavy with 33 submarines sunk between 1941 and 1945. M-103 disappeared in the Baltic Sea in mid-August 1941. The wreck was discovered in the late 1990s during a NATO minesweeping training exercise. Seven submarines were lost in the Black Sea, four depth-charged and sunk by Romanian warships (M-31 by the flotilla leader , M-58 by the destroyer Regina Maria, M-59 by the destroyer Regele Ferdinand and M-118 by the Romanian gunboats Ghiculescu and Stihi) (both M-58 and M-59 however are also reported as lost on Romanian laid mines, while M-31 was also claimed by mines or a German vessel )
and three were sunk in minefields laid by the Romanian minelayers , Dacia and Regele Carol I.  By 1945, some 111 M-class submarines had been completed, with another 30 XV-series completed between 1945 and 1947.

Cold War
Two submarines of the early series of this class, along with two s, (S-52 and S-53) and two s (under lease, S-121 and S-123) were sold to the People's Republic of China in June 1954 as the foundation of the People's Liberation Army Navy Submarine Force. Both the M- and S-class submarines were sold to China, and two more M-XV series of this class (M-278 and M-279) were sold to China a few years later in 1956.Those purchased by China were renamed, but the two leased Shchuka-class submarines were not. The four M-class submarines bought by China were renamed National Defense # 21, 22, 23 (ex M-278) and 24 (ex M-279) respectively.

Modern times
An M-class submarine was discovered near Tallinn in May 2012. It is believed to be M-216, which was intentionally sunk in the area in 1962 for training purposes. Divers have confirmed that many components, including the periscope, are missing. It is also believed that the training exercise may have been ordered as a result of several deadly submarine accidents in the 1950s. One such accident happened near Paldiski, where the entire crew of M-200 died during a failed rescue operation.

It is believed to be either M-34 or M-58, both being lost to Romanian minefields. The submarine is buried in sand up to the deck level and also completely filled with sand, making any further identification almost impossible. The upper part of the hull shows a pretty high level of damage - many ribs are exposed. The aft hatch was partially opened. The hull is in one piece, with the conning tower and deck gun intact.

Versions
Series VI 30 submarines constructed between 1932 and 1934 were 37.5 m long and displaced 201 tons submerged (158 tons surfaced).

M-1
M-2
M-3
M-4
M-5
M-6
M-7
M-8
M-9

M-10
M-11
M-12
M-13
M-14
M-15
M-16
M-17
M-18
M-19

M-20
M-21
M-22
M-23
M-24
M-25
M-26
M-27
M-28
M-51
M-52

Series VI-bis 19 submarines built in four sections between 1934 and 1936) were 37.5 m long and displaced 202 tons submerged (161 tons surfaced).

M-53
M-54
M-55
M-56

M-71	(lost on 24 June 1941)
M-72
M-73
M-74	(lost on 23 September 1941)
M-75
M-76
M-77
M-78	(lost on 23 June 1941)
M-79
	
M-80	(lost on 24 June 1941)
M-81	(lost on 1 July 1941)
M-82
M-83	(lost on 27 June 1941)
M-84
M-85
M-86

Series XII 45 submarines built in six sections between 1936 and 1941 were 44.5 m long, and displaced 258 tons submerged (206 tons surfaced).

M-30
M-31	(lost on 17 December 1942)
M-32
M-33	(lost on 22 August 1942)
M-34	(lost on 3 November 1941)
M-35	
M-36	(lost on 4 January 1944)
M-57	(lost in August 1941)
M-58	(lost in October 1941)
M-59	(lost in November 1941)
M-60   (lost in September 1942)
M-62
M-63	(lost in August 1941)
M-90
M-92
M-94	(lost on 21 July 1941)
M-95	(lost in June 1942)
M-96	(lost on 8 September 1944)
M-97	(lost on 15 August 1942)
M-98	(lost on 14 November 1941)
M-99	(lost on 27 June 1941)

M-102
M-103	(lost in August 1941)
M-104
M-105
M-106	(lost on 5 July 1943)
M-107
M-108	(lost on 28 February 1944)
M-111	
M-112
M-113
M-114
M-115
M-116
M-117
M-118	(lost on 1 October 1942)
M-119
M-120
M-121	(lost in November 1942)
M-122	(lost on 14 May 1943)
M-171
M-172	(lost in October 1943)
M-173	(lost in August 1942)
M-174	(lost in October 1943)
M-176	(lost in July 1942)
M-175	(lost on 10 January 1942)

	

Series XV 4 submarines built in seven sections during World War II while other 11 built after it, until 1953 were 53.0 m long, and displaced 420 tons submerged (350 tons surfaced).

Completed during World War II:
M-200	(lost on 21 November 1956)
M-201
M-202
M-203

Completed after World War II:
M-204
M-205
M-206
M-214
M-215
M-216
M-217
M-218
M-219
M-234
M-235
M-290

Both series VI and VI-bis were constructed by A. N. Asafov. Series XII was made by P. I. Serdyuk and series XV was created by F. F. Polushkin.

References

 Erminio Bagnasco, Submarines of World War II, Cassell & Co, London. 1977 

Submarine classes
Submarines of the Soviet Navy
 
Russian and Soviet navy submarine classes
 
Ships of the People's Liberation Army Navy